The Steyn City Championship was a professional golf tournament held at The Club at Steyn City, in Midrand, South Africa.

The tournament was introduced for the 2022 season as a co-sanctioned European Tour and Sunshine Tour event.

Shaun Norris won the inaugural event, scoring 25-under-par for four rounds. He beat Dean Burmester by three shots.

Winners

Notes

References

External links
Coverage on European Tour official site

Former European Tour events
Former Sunshine Tour events
Golf tournaments in South Africa